Clark Township is a township in Aitkin County, Minnesota, United States. The population was 169 as of the 2010 census.

History
Clark Township was named for Frank Clark, an early settler. It was incorporated May 27, 1902.

Geography

The city of Tamarack lies within the township but is a separate entity.

Major highway
  Minnesota State Highway 210

Lakes
 Bone Lake
 Clear Lake
 Cranberry Lake
 Douglas Lake
 Kelly Lake
 Kettle Lake
 Little Lake
 Louma Lake
 Mud Lake
 Nelson Lake
 Rice Lake (vast majority)
 Spruce Lake

Adjacent townships
 Haugen Township (north)
 Beseman Township, Carlton County (northeast)
 Lakeview Township, Carlton County (east)
 Salo Township (south)
 Spalding Township (southwest)
 McGregor Township (west)
 Shamrock Township (northwest)

Cemeteries
The township contains Fairview Cemetery.

Demographics
As of the census of 2000, there were 148 people, 55 households, and 37 families residing in the township. The population density was 4.7 people per square mile (1.8/km2). There were 89 housing units at an average density of 2.8/sq mi (1.1/km2). The racial makeup of the township was 87.16% White and 12.84% Native American.

There were 55 households, out of which 25.5% had children under the age of 18 living with them, 65.5% were married couples living together, and 32.7% were non-families. 30.9% of all households were made up of individuals, and 14.5% had someone living alone who was 65 years of age or older. The average household size was 2.69 and the average family size was 3.38.

In the township the population was spread out, with 31.1% under the age of 18, 2.7% from 18 to 24, 23.6% from 25 to 44, 27.0% from 45 to 64, and 15.5% who were 65 years of age or older. The median age was 41 years. For every 100 females, there were 114.5 males. For every 100 females age 18 and over, there were 100.0 males.

The median income for a household in the township was $26,250, and the median income for a family was $36,250. Males had a median income of $26,250 versus $21,250 for females. The per capita income for the township was $13,591. There were 17.5% of families and 23.6% of the population living below the poverty line, including 33.3% of under eighteens and 19.2% of those over 64.

References
 United States National Atlas
 United States Census Bureau 2007 TIGER/Line Shapefiles
 United States Board on Geographic Names (GNIS)

Townships in Aitkin County, Minnesota
Townships in Minnesota